Henry Orlestus Fairbanks (1852–1928) was the second mayor of Quincy, Massachusetts.

Bibliography
 History of Norfolk County, Massachusetts, 1622–1918, Volume II, edited by Louis Atwood Cook. Published by S. J. Clarke Publishing Company, 1918. pp. 74–79.
Massachusetts of Today: A Memorial of the State, Historical and Biographical, Issued for the World's Columbian Exposition at Chicago, page 435, (1892).

Notes

1852 births
1928 deaths
Massachusetts city council members
Massachusetts Republicans
Mayors of Quincy, Massachusetts
Politicians from Boston